Dan Mozena (born May 1, 1949 in Dubuque, Iowa) is a United States Foreign Service Officer and a member of the Senior Foreign Service. He served as the United States Ambassador to Angola 2007–2010 and as United States Ambassador to Bangladesh 2011–2015.

Education and early career
Mozena graduated from Iowa State University in 1970 with a Bachelor of Science degree in history and government.  He participated in a cultural exchange program to Nepal under the auspices of the National 4-H Council from 1970 to 1971.  From 1971 to 1974, Mozena attended graduate school at the University of Wisconsin-Madison.  He graduated in 1974 with a Master of Arts degree in political science and a Master of Public Administration degree.  From 1974 to 1976, Mozena was a Peace Corps volunteer in Zaire.  Before joining the Foreign Service, Mozena worked as a program specialist from 1977 to 1981 for the National 4-H Council in Chevy Chase, Maryland.

Foreign Service career
Ambassador Mozena joined the U.S. Foreign Service as a Political Officer in 1981.

1982 - 1983:  Consular Officer, U.S. Embassy, Lusaka, Zambia
1983 - 1985:  Economic Officer and Political Officer, U.S. Embassy, Kinshasa, Zaire
1985 - 1988:  Public Diplomacy Officer, Office of Strategic Nuclear Policy, Political-Military Bureau, Dept. of State
1988 - 1989:  Hindi language study, Foreign Service Institute
1989 - 1992:  Deputy Counselor for Political Affairs, U.S. Embassy, New Delhi, India
1992 - 1993:  Officer-in-Charge, South African Affairs, Dept. of State
1993 - 1995:  Deputy Director, Office of Southern African Affairs, Dept. of State
1995 - 1998:  Deputy Counselor for Political Affairs, U.S. Embassy, Islamabad, Pakistan
1998 - 2001:  Counselor for Political and Economic Affairs, U.S. Embassy, Dhaka, Bangladesh
2001 - 2004:  Deputy Chief of Mission, U.S. Embassy, Lusaka, Zambia
2004 - 2007:  Director, Office of Southern African Affairs, Dept of State, Washington
2007 - 2010:  U.S. Ambassador to Angola, Luanda, Angola
2010 - 2011:  Professor of National Security, National War College, Washington
2011 - 2014:  U.S. Ambassador to Bangladesh, Dhaka, Bangladesh

Family
Mozena is the second of four sons and one daughter of Kenneth and Edna Mozena.  In 1971, Mozena married Grace Feeney.  They have two children: Anne (1979) and Mark (1983).

References

External links

Note form Mozena : http://gurumia.com/2014/12/22/goodbye-wonderful-bangladesh-dan-mozena/

1949 births
Living people
Ambassadors of the United States to Angola
Ambassadors of the United States to Bangladesh
Iowa State University alumni
People from Dubuque, Iowa
University of Wisconsin–Madison College of Letters and Science alumni
United States Foreign Service personnel
Robert M. La Follette School of Public Affairs alumni
21st-century American diplomats